This is a list of films produced by the Israeli film industry in 1991.

1991 releases

Unknown premiere date

Awards

See also
1991 in Israel

References

External links
 Israeli films of 1991 at the Internet Movie Database

Israeli
Film
1991